Bashkir–Russian code-switching is a code-switching widespread among Bashkir people of Russia and ex-Soviet republics who speak both Russian and Bashkir language (i.e. bilingual people).

Background 
Russian language has status of the official language of Russian Federation and is also used as the international communication language; at the same moment Bashkir language is the official one in the Republic of Bashkortostan. However, different field of activities require from people high level of Russian and Bashkir language proficiency. Therefore, due to historical events and circumstances, the Baskir–Russian code-switching has appeared.

Its character is asymmetric: such code-switching is typical for many Russian-speaking Bashkortostan residents, whose level of Bashkir language proficiency is limited due to lack of practical skills. The level of Bashkir proficiency is quite high for Bashkirs in villages (about 92%) and in cities (more than 74%); about 50% Bashkirs of the urban area and 24% of rural area have high levels of balanced Bashkir-Russian bilingualism; about 32% of Bashkirs of the urban area and 6,4% Bashkirs of the rural area have higher skills in Russian than in Bashkir.

Also there are multiple cases of multilingualism for Tatar, Russian and Bashkir languages in Bashkortostan, in such cases Bashkir language plays role of another international communication language/

Interference 
The Bashkir-Russian interference  in the speech of bilingual people who speak Bashkir and Russian languages may be presented on phonological, grammar and lexical levels of languages and may lead to some problems during the Russian and Bashkir children co-education process.

The most common interference cases are in the similar-sounding words like:
  —  («act»)
  —  («drugstore»)
 ба[ту]н (ba-toon) — батон (ba-toan; «biscuit, loaf»)
 би[ту]н (be-toon) — бидон (be-doan; «crate, tin»)
 гал[уш] (ga-loosh) — галоши (ga-lo-she; «galoshes»)
 [малатук] (ma-la-took) — молоток (mo-lo-tok; «hammer»)
 т[э]р[и]лк[э] (ta-ryl-kae) — тарелка (ta-rel-ka; «plate»)
 [е]ст[э]л (e-stel) — стол (stol; «table»)
 самуаыр (sa-mua-yr) — самовар (samovar)

The interference may be presented in sentences and is very sensitive to influence of the environment:
 Мин пошёл. Можно мы я книгу возьму? (Me went. Can we I take a book?)
 Ты будешь достать эту банку варенья из подпола (You will do have taken that jar with jam from the crawl space)
 Я буду написать сочинение о весне (I will do have written essay on spring)

Other examples of phonological interference:
 The odd vowel between consonants in the middle of the word: проспе[кыт] — проспект (boulevard), ак[ы]т — акт (act)
 The odd vowel between consonants in the beginning of the word (typical for bilinguals): [ыштан] — штаны (pants)
 Extrapolating Bashkir phonetics to Russian, expressed in replacing of sounds
 Extrapolating Bashkir grammar to Russian: Мальчик учить собаку (A boy to teach a dog)

The language interference problems can be solved by the advanced language learning, systematic work on lexis improvement, reading the literature and observing the oral and written speech.

 See also 
 Tatar–Russian code-switching

 References 

 Literature 
 
 Юлдашев Ю. Х.'' Национально-русское двуязычие в Республике Башкортостан в современных условиях. Уфа, 2007.
 О двуязычии в Башкирской ССР // Проблемы духовной культуры тюркских народов СССР. Уфа, 1991.
 Этноязыковая ситуация в Ленинском районе г. Уфы (социолингвистический аспект) Л Проблемы духовной культуры тюркских народов СССР. Уфа, 1991.
 О некоторых особенностях двуязычия // Наука Урала. Свердловск, 1991. No. 16.
 Проблемы двуязычия в городе // Вопросы этнографии городского населения Башкортостана. Уфа, 1992.
 Zakirianov K. Z., Zainullin M. V. BASHKIR-RUSSIAN BILINGUALISM AS A PHENOMENON OF MUTUAL ENRICHMENT OF CULTURES // Vestnik Bashkirskogo Universiteta. 2015. Vol. 20. No. 1. Pp. 166-171.

Bashkir language
Russian language
Code-switching